Mater et magistra is the encyclical written by Pope John XXIII on the topic of "Christianity and Social Progress". It was promulgated on 15 May 1961. The title means "mother and teacher", referring to the role of the church.  It describes a necessity to work towards authentic community in order to promote human dignity.  It taught that the state must sometimes intervene in matters of health care, education, and housing.

Context
Mater et magistra was written in observance of the 70th anniversary of Pope Leo XIII's social encyclical Rerum novarum. It also refers to the social teaching of Pope Pius XI in Quadragesimo anno, and of Pope Pius XII in a radio broadcast given 1 June 1941.
The document mentions the following changes in the world since then:
 scientific advances including atomic energy, synthetic materials, increased automation, modern agriculture, new means of communication (radio and television), faster transportation, the beginnings of space travel
 new social systems such as social security, improved basic education, breaking down of class barriers, and greater awareness of public affairs by the average person
 lack of economic balance between agriculture and industry, and among different countries
 in the political sphere, the breakdown of colonialism, independence for many states in Asia and Africa, and an increasing network of international organizations.

The Second Vatican Council opened a little more than a year after Mater et magistra was promulgated.

Review of previous teaching
Mater et magistra begins by praising three earlier papal documents on social topics and summarizing their key points.

Rerum Novarum is extolled: "Here for the first time was a complete synthesis of social principles, formulated with such historical insight as to be of permanent value to Christendom ... rightly regarded as a compendium of Catholic social and economic teaching",  "the Magna Charta of social and economic reconstruction" whose influence was not only apparent in later Church documents, but "discernible too in the subsequent legislation of a number of States". Pope John summarized the main points of Rerum Novarum as work, private property, the role of the state, right of association, and human solidarity.
He summarized the main message of Quadragesimo anno, as two key points:
 Charity, not self-interest, should be "the supreme criterion in economic matters".
 It is the responsibility of humankind to create a national and international order that promotes social justice, "in which all economic activity can be conducted not merely for private gain but also in the interests of the common good".
He also mentioned a radio address given by Pope Pius XII on 1 June 1941, in which he had commemorated the 50th anniversary of Rerum Novarum and reiterated its message on subjects of the right use of material goods, work, and family.

Clarifications and new aspects

Common good seen as balance
Mater et magistra frequently explains the common good as a desirable balance between different elements of the society or the economy.  For example, a business must balance its unity of direction with the needs of its individual workers.  Development and progress in the industrial, service, and agricultural sectors must balance. Individual freedom and initiative must balance with necessary action of the civil authority, including the appropriate public ownership of property, based on the principle of subsidiarity.  Economic progress should balance with social progress, especially a reduction in inequality.

Special concern for agriculture
The Pope writes of the dignity of agricultural work, with the family farm held up as an ideal. A trend of people moving away from farms toward cities was partly due to economic growth, but also reflected depression in the occupation of farming and inadequate standards of living in rural areas. The Pope urged that measures be taken to restore balance between the agricultural sector and industry, as well as development of better facilities and services in rural areas so that "agricultural living standards approximate as closely as possible those enjoyed by city dwellers".

Specific suggestions include:
 developing better roads, communication, drinking water, housing, and schools in rural areas
 ensuring that farms modernize at the same rate as industry
 keeping track of people who move away from farms due to modernization, and insuring that they receive help in adjusting to new types of work
 considering the particular needs of farmers in credit policy and the tax system
 ensuring that farmers get the same social insurance/social security as others
 devising a means of price protection, which could be enforced by the public authority
 establishing industries, especially those having to do with "preservation, processing, and transportation of farm products", in agricultural regions
 self-advancement of the farming community through continuing education and the forming of associations.

The Pope comments on disproportions that exist between the population and the amount of arable land, as well as different levels of agricultural methods, in different parts of the world.  These often result in surpluses and scarcities. "[The] solidarity of the human race and Christian brotherhood demand the elimination as far as possible of these discrepancies."

The Food and Agriculture Organization is mentioned for its work in improvement of agriculture and developing international cooperation.

International assistance
Mater et magistra addresses the needs of countries that were not industrialized.  Pope John commends wealthier nations that give assistance to poorer nations.  It is required by "justice and humanity" to share surplus food and other goods with other nations in need. Even more powerful are efforts to provide the citizens of those nations with the necessary resources and training to implement modern methods and speed up development. This work should be done with respect for the local cultures and in a disinterested way, without the aim of imposing one’s own culture or gaining political control.

See also
 List of encyclicals of Pope John XXIII
Mater si, magistra no

References

Notes

External links
Text of the encyclical
Mater et Magistra, TIME magazine, 1969.
 Teacher Yes, Mother No, TIME, 1961.

Papal encyclicals
Documents of the Catholic Social Teaching tradition
Works by Pope John XXIII
1961 documents
1961 in Christianity
May 1961 events